The Battle of Raigarh occurred between the Mughal Empire and Maratha Empire in 1689.Aurangzeb ordered his General Zulfiqar Khan to capture the Maratha king, Rajaram. Mughal forces attacked Raigad (Raigarh) and the fortress fell, however Rajaram escaped before that happened.

Aftermath
The mothers, wives, daughters and sons of Sambhaji and Rajaram were taken as prisoners by Zulfiqar Khan Nusrat Jung The captured members were treated graciously. Aurangzeb ordered a tent to be set-up for them in Gulbarga. And they were alrighted with all respect and privacy. Annual pensions were fixed on all of them according to their position.

Abdul Rahim Khan was ordered to go and  confiscate the property from the Fort. Itiqad Khan was rewarded by promotion to the rank of 3 hazari (2,000 troops) and gifts, and was honoured by the title 'Zulfiqar Khan Bahadur'.

References

Raigarh
Raigarh 1689
1689 in India
Raigarh 1689